Imani Hakim (born 1993) is an American actress. She is best known for her role as Tonya Rock on the UPN/CW sitcom Everybody Hates Chris as well as portraying Olympic gold medalist Gabby Douglas in the 2014 Lifetime original movie The Gabby Douglas Story. Hakim acted in the films Chocolate City and Burning Sands, and currently has a supporting role on the Apple TV+ series Mythic Quest.

Career
Hakim was born and raised in Cleveland, Ohio. She has two older brothers and three younger brothers. When she was seven she studied acting at Karamu House Theater in Cleveland. She convinced her parents to allow her to pursue a professional acting career when she was 11 and moved to Los Angeles with her father to find work. They experienced homelessness during that time and frequently slept in their car. However, within a few months, she booked her first role as Chris's little sister Tonya on Everybody Hates Chris. The series was on-air for four seasons, from 2005 to 2009. During that time, she was homeschooled. In California, Hakim continued to study acting at Alexander's Workshop School in Lakewood and at The Young Actor's Space in Burbank.

Hakim later starred as Olympic gymnast Gabby Douglas in the Lifetime biopic The Gabby Douglas Story (2014). The next year she acted in a supporting role in the film Chocolate City starring Robert Ri'chard.

As of 2020, she portrays Dana, a video game tester, on the Apple TV+ comedy series Mythic Quest. The series was renewed for a third and fourth season in 2021. She also co-starred in the film Dinner Party in 2020.

Personal life 
Hakim follows a vegan diet. She enjoys painting in her free time.

Filmography

References

External links
 Imani Hakim on Instagram

American child actresses
1993 births
Living people
American television actresses
21st-century American actresses
Actresses from Cleveland
African-American actresses
Entertainers from Ohio
21st-century African-American women
21st-century African-American people